(Spanish for "alone") may refer to:

 "A solas", a song by María Becerra from Animal
 "A solas", a song by Karol G from Unstoppable
 "A solas", a song by Lunay and Lyanno
 "A solas", a song by Rels B and Indigo Jams

See also

 
 Solas (disambiguation)